Geoffrey Richard Russom is an American philologist who is Professor Emeritus of English at Brown University.

Biography
Russom received his B.A. cum laude with Departmental Honors from Stanford University in June 1968,  his M.A. from Stony Brook University in June 1970, and his Ph.D. from Stony Brook University in June 1973. His Ph.D. dissertation examined the originality of the scops of Old English literature.

After gaining his degrees, Russom served as Assistant Professor (1972-1973), Associate Professor (1978–1979) and Professor (1986–2009) of English at Brown University. Since January 2009 he has been Professor Emeritus of English at Brown University.

Russom's research centers on Old English, Middle English, Old Norse, and Old Irish literature, Germanic linguistics, poetry, and the concept of "barbarians" in imperialist writing. He particularly known as a specialist on Beowulf. He has written a number of significant works on these subjects. Russom is a member of the Linguistic Society of America, the Medieval Academy of America, and the Society for Germanic Linguistics.

Selected works
 Old English Meter and Linguistic Theory, 1987
 Beowulf and Old Germanic Metre, 1988
 The Evolution of Verse Structure in Old and Middle English Poetry, 2017

See also
 Robert D. Fulk
 Tom Shippey
 Leonard Neidorf

References

External links
 Geoffrey Russom at the website of Brown University

Living people
American medievalists
American philologists
Anglo-Saxon studies scholars
Brown University faculty
Celtic studies scholars
Fellows of the Medieval Academy of America
Fellows of the Linguistic Society of America
Germanic studies scholars
Linguists of Germanic languages
Stanford University alumni
Stony Brook University alumni
Old Norse studies scholars
Year of birth missing (living people)